Tortellini are pasta originally from the Italian region of Emilia (in particular Bologna and Modena). Traditionally they are stuffed with a mix of meat (pork loin, raw prosciutto, mortadella), Parmigiano Reggiano cheese, egg and nutmeg and served in capon broth (in brodo di cappone).

In the area of origin they are usually sold fresh or home-made. Industrially packaged, dried, refrigerated, or frozen tortellini appear in many locations around the world, especially where there are large Italian communities.

Origins
The origin of tortellini is disputed; both Bologna and Modena, cities in Italy's Emilia-Romagna region, claim to be its birthplace. OxfordDictionaries.com traces the etymology of tortellini to the diminutive form of tortello, itself a diminutive of torta ("cake" or "pie" in Italian). 

The recipe for a dish called "torteletti" appears in 1570 from Bartolomeo Scappi. Vincenzo Tanara's writings in the mid-17th century may be responsible for the pasta's renaming to tortellini. In the 1800s, legends sprang up to explain the recipe's origins, offering a compromise.  Castelfranco Emilia, located between Bologna and Modena, is featured in one legend, in which Venus stays at an inn. Overcome by her beauty, the innkeeper spies on her through a keyhole, through which he can only see her navel. He is inspired to create a pasta in this shape. This legend would be at the origin of the term "ombelico di Venere" (Venus' navel), occasionally used to describe tortellini. In honor of this legend, an annual festival is held in Castelfranco Emilia. Another legend posits that the shape comes from Modena's architecture, which resembles a turtle.

Comparison with tortelloni
Tortelloni is pasta in a similar shape, but larger, typically 5 g, vs. 2 g for tortellini, and with the extremities closed differently. While tortellini have a meat-based filling, tortelloni are filled with ricotta and sometimes with parsley or spinach. Moreover, while tortellini are traditionally cooked in and served with broth, tortelloni are cooked in water, stir-fried (traditionally with butter and sage) and served dry.

Production process

Production steps 

 Knead the ground pork, along with the other ingredients, to make the stuffing
 Knead the flour and eggs to make the dough
 Flatten the dough
 Cut the flattened dough into squares
 Deposit a portion of stuffing on each square of dough
 Shape the tortellino

Equipment

Homemade 

 chopping board
 knife
 rolling pin
 Dough Rolling Board

Industry 

 mincer
 kneading machine
 sheeter
 Forming machine (tortellini machine)

See also

 Agnolini
 Agnolotti
 Cappelletti (pasta)
 List of pasta
 Tortelloni

References

External links

Hand-made tortellini  original recipe by a cooking school located in Bologna
Hand-made tortellini in brodo how-to, with video
Tortellini production video
From the rolled out egg-rich and flour pasta dough, stuffed with a mix of meat, the hand made production of tortellini (navel-shaped pasta) - video

Types of pasta
Dumplings
Cuisine of Emilia-Romagna